Thomas Vogel may refer to:
 Thomas Vogel (historian) (born 1959), German historian
 Thomas Vogel (footballer, born 1965), German footballer
 Thomas Vogel (footballer, born 1967), German footballer